"Door" is the eighth album of the Japanese pop rock group Every Little Thing, released on March 5, 2008.

Critical reception

The album received mixed reviews from critics. Adam Greenberg from Allmusic stated "Every Little Thing went on a explanatory route for Door. Door is somewhat scattered, touching on basic pop, rock, ambient electronica, reggae, and much more, but never quite trying the various threads together in a convincing way."

Track listing

Notes
 co-arranged by Every Little Thing
 co-arranged by Ichiro Ito

Charts

References

2008 albums
Every Little Thing (band) albums